The 45th Launch Support Squadron(45 LCSS) is a United States Air Force unit stationed at Cape Canaveral Air Force Station, Florida. It is assigned to the 45th Launch Group along with its sister squadron the 5th Space Launch Squadron.

Mission
The 45th Launch Support Squadron (LCSS) delivers a broad array of organic launch and launch support capabilities.  In partnership with the satellite system directorates, the LCSS provides launch-base mission assurance for satellites by overseeing spacecraft hardware arrival, launch preparations, testing and launch. In addition, the squadron contains a program management office which ensures delivery of mission-critical facilities, launch support services such as training and ordnance management, and programmatic resources to Eastern Range customers. Finally, the LCSS provides a single interface for emerging DoD, civil, and commercial launch providers to access 45 SW services and successfully bring new launch capabilities to the United States.

History
The 45th Launch Support Squadron was activated on June 30, 2005. The first mission with spacecraft processed by the 45 LCSS was the Micro-satellite Technology Experiment (MiTEx) which launched on June 21, 2006.

Emblem
Description

On a disc Sable, arrayed to chief three deltas Silver Gray each with a contrail Or fimbriated Tenné issuing from behind a terrestrial globe Proper, environed by an orbit of the fourth charged with a sphere of the second, all within a narrow border Orange.

Attached below the disc, a Black scroll edged with a narrow Orange border and inscribed “45TH LAUNCH SUPPORT SQUADRON” in Orange letters.

Symbolism

Ultramarine blue and Air Force yellow are the Air Force colors.  Blue alludes to the sky, the primary theater of Air Force operations.  Yellow refers to the sun and the excellence required of Air Force personnel.  The black background represents space.  The three deltas signify the multiple launch vehicles the Squadron supports and the three Air Force Core Values:  Integrity First, Service Before Self, and Excellence in All We Do.  The earth and orbiting satellite describes the global nature of the unit’s mission.

List of commanders

Lt Col Scott Traxler
Lt Col John Wagner
Lt Col Erik Bowman
Lt Col Gerard G. Gleckel Jr.
Lt Col Paul P. Konyha III
Lt Col Matthew E. Holston, July 2014 – July 2016
Lt Col Kathryn Cantu, 15 August 2016 – present

45 LCSS Missions

List of LCSS Launches

References

External links

Space Launch 5
Military units and formations in Florida